The 2016 Holiday Bowl was a postseason college football bowl game, played at Qualcomm Stadium in San Diego, California, on December 27, 2016. This was the last time the Holiday Bowl was played at Qualcomm Stadium. Beginning in 2017, the game was played at SDCCU Stadium, the home of the SDSU Aztecs. The 39th edition of the Holiday Bowl featured the Minnesota Golden Gophers of the Big Ten Conference versus the Washington State Cougars of the Pac-12 Conference.  Sponsored by small business loan company National Funding, the game is officially known as the National Funding Holiday Bowl.

Teams

Minnesota 

This was Minnesota's first appearance in the Holiday Bowl. On December 15, Minnesota players threatened to boycott all football activity, including participation in the 2016 Holiday Bowl, in protest against a decision to suspend ten players from the team. The suspension was made as a result of school investigation into sexual assault charges from the beginning of school year. The legal process had already run its course, with no charges filed. On December 17, the Golden Gophers ended their boycott and announced they would play.

Washington State 

This was Washington State's third appearance in the Holiday Bowl, having lost to #14 Brigham Young in 1981, and having defeated #5 Texas in 2003.

Game summary

Scoring summary

Statistics

References 

2016–17 NCAA football bowl games
2016
2016 Holiday Bowl
2016 Holiday Bowl
2016 in sports in California
December 2016 sports events in the United States